HD 221148 is suspected variable star in the equatorial constellation of Aquarius. The spectrum of the star shows exceptionally strong levels of CN; one of the highest cyanogen indices measured.

References

External links
 HR 8924 Catalog
 Image HD 221148

Aquarius (constellation)
221148
115953
K-type giants
8924
Suspected variables
Durchmusterung objects